Geochelone is a genus of tortoises.

Geochelone tortoises, which are also known as typical tortoises or terrestrial turtles, can be found in southern Asia. They primarily eat plants.

Species
The genus consists of two extant species:

A number of tortoise species have been recently removed from the genus. This taxon as formerly defined was "polyphyletic, representing at least five independent clades". Tortoises removed include members of Aldabrachelys (from the Seychelles and Madagascar), Astrochelys (Madagascar), Chelonoidis (South America and the Galápagos Islands), Stigmochelys and Centrochelys (Africa), and the extinct Megalochelys (southern Asia).
These species are also unique for their ability to remember patterns and spatial pathways. Similar to mammals, these tortoises can remember directions and pathways by remembering the correct pathways in their long-term memory.

Fossils
  Geochelone burchardi Tenerife giant tortoise
  Geochelone vulcanica Gran Canaria giant tortoise
  Geochelone robusta Malta giant tortoise

"Self-righting" shell

The form of the shell of the Indian star tortoise resembles a gömböc, allowing it to turn over when lying upside down very easily.

References

Geochelone Report in Integrated Taxonomic Information System. Retrieved January 12, 2008.

External links
 
 Care tips

 
Turtle genera
Taxa named by Leopold Fitzinger
Extant Miocene first appearances